The Seferberlik (from) was the mobilization effected by the late Ottoman Empire during the Second Balkan War of 1913 and World War I from 1914 to 1918, which involved the forced conscription of Lebanese, Palestinian, Syrian, and Kurdish men to fight on its behalf and deportation of "numerous Lebanese & Syrian & Kurdish families (5,000 according to one contemporary account)" to Anatolia under Djemal Pasha's orders. Lebanese & Syrians & Kurds accused of desertion were executed, and some 300,000 of the Arabs and Kurds who had stayed behind had died of Lebanon famine, as Lebanon & Syria lost 75 to 90 percent of its crop production. Prostitution or cannibalism were mentioned in reports or memoirs written after the end of the war.

Terminology 

As explained by Najwa al-Qattan,
Originally an Ottoman Turkish term, seferberlik was part of official state discourse referring to wartime mobilization either during the second Balkan war or World War I which followed it. Announcements calling for mobilization were posted in public areas in Ottoman towns and distributed to local leaders, and the word seferberlik was prominently printed on top.

Ahmen Amin Saleh Murshid, a historian of Al-Medina, and Zakarya Muhammad al-Kenisi, a historian who specialized in old Ottoman Turkish, disagree over the general meaning of the term Seferberlik.  Saleh Murshid believes the term connotes the meaning of a collective deportation, especially in the context of the inhabitants of the city of Medina under the leadership of Fakhri Pasha. In addition, Saleh Murshid argues that historians should not rely exclusively on dictionaries and documents to translate Ottoman Turkish terms into Arabic. Lived experiences and popular understandings of these terms are crucial in explaining these terms. Zakarya Muhammad al-Kenisi argues that the term Seferberlik means preparation of the armies for war or a military campaign. He argues that Ottoman Turkish translations regarding the history of Medina contains substantial errors that resulted in different meanings and understandings of Medina's history. Although both scholars disagree over the meaning of Seferberlik, they are in agreement about the events that the term Seferberlik describes.

History 

The Seferberlik went on with resistance; young men in Lebanon & Syria did not feel related to or concerned by the rationale for Ottoman wars. When the Seferberlik was announced they sometimes hid during the process or fled during battles. As a countermeasure to the escaping from enslavery conscription or desertion from war fronts, the government sent bounty hunters to roam city streets and catch young men and deserters. It has been said that officials carried ropes with them to encircle, tie up and carry off boys and men on the run.

The Syrian journalist Abd al-Ghani al-Utri in his book I’tirafat Shami ‘atiq; sira dhattyya wa suwar dimashqiyya (translated: Confessions of an old Damascene, Biography and Damascene pictures) suggests that Syrians have sanctified bread even since the Great War. The diary of a Palestinian Ottoman soldier, Ihsan Turjman, during WWI clearly describes the scarcity of foodstuffs and the overpricing sugar, rice and grains. In al-Ghazzi’s book Shirwal Barhum (translated: The Pants of Barhum), during Seferberlik people were depicted as fighting over lemon and orange rinds while children pick watermelon rinds from the mud. Siham Turjman tells the account of her mother who was then 14 years old and tells that during the Seferberlik everything was expensive, people would line up in front of the bakery at midnight to buy the following morning coal-like, burnt, and overpriced bread. Seferberlik is associated with cannibalism during the war’s famine. Memoirs and reports published shortly after the end of the Great War gave an account of the horrific scenes of famine that filled Lebanon’s streets. In Antun Yamin’s Lubnan fi al-Harb--a two-volume history published in 1919— a section entitled "Stories that Would Shake Rocks" gives a detailed report of moments when people attacked corpses of dead animals and children and ate them. Also, Hanna Mina in Fragments of Memory tells the childhood memories of his father:
What are they supposed to do during this famine? Bide your time...people will eat each other when winter comes. They aren't to be blamed. During the Safar Barrlik, mothers ate their children. They became like cats and ate their children... What good will sticks or guns do? They'll only hasten death and bring people relief... Let's be patient... A way out may come from some unknown source.

In his diary entry for April 29, 1915, a common soldier in the Ottoman military headquarters in 
Jerusalem, Ihsan Turjman (1893–1917), mentioned his encounter with a prostitute in the streets of the city, the sight of whom filled him with concern for all the women who "found that they could not survive without prostituting themselves." Yusuf Shalhub, the famous Zajal poet, lamented the deterioration of living conditions during the War, which led many women to sell their bodies in exchange for bread.

Seferberlik in Medina (Saudi Arabia) 
In Medina's memory of the war, Seferberlik refers to the collective deportation of the city's inhabitants by the famous Hijaz train. According to current research on the topic in Medina, Seferberlik for the original inhabitants of the city invokes memories of humiliation and the destruction of social and familial structure. Families, women and children were dragged to the train and randomly abandoned in Greater Syria, Iraq, and Turkey. According to the same source, only 140 people remained in the city and they suffered from food shortages caused by the Ottoman military leader Omar Fakhr eddin, also known as Fakhri Pasha.

Seferberlik in Arabic literature, filmography, and historiography 

Seferberlik and the memories associated with it constitute an important element in Arabic literature. Poets and Authors whose parents endured the hardships associated with the Seferberlik received first-hand accounts of war experience and the means by which the war impacted the society in Greater Syria. These authors and poets have used the material of the Seferberlik in various contexts. Some authors used it in novels such as Nadia Al-Ghazzi, Hanna Mina...etc. In addition to the literature, authors of cities or villages popular history during the early 20th century mentioned the Seferberlik in regards to the war, and it was depicted as an essential event in the history of this period. A substantial amount of historical books were produced, including Ṭarāʼif wa-ṣuwar min tārīkh Dimashq (Anecdotes and pictures from the history of Damascus) by Hānī Khayyir and Siham Turjman's book Ya Mal el-Sham (The Daughter of Damascus). Novelists, journalists, and playwrights used the oral accounts of those who lived and experienced WWI, and the miseries of the Seferberlik that they described to produce an impressive body of literary and drama production. The Seferberlik scenes report on the miserable circumstances people lived through.

In the 20th century Arabic's literature and Arab history accounts of the period the Seferberlik became a synonym for the famous famine that overran the Levant, especially Mont Lebanon, in 1916 during World War I.  In the same context, the term Seferberlik was used to refer to the event of the war itself. In Siham Turjma’ s book Daughters of Damascus chapter on "The Seferberlik," tells the memories of her father who, according to his tale, was conscripted "to go to the Seferberlik" i.e. the war and worked as a telegrapher and communication officer on the front lines. Also Abdul Fattah Qal'aji wrote his book Urs Ḥalabī wa-hikāyāt min Safar Barlik (Aleppine wedding and stories from the Seferberlik). The Seferberlik in this book is a synonym for the war and its events.

The Seferberlik has also emerged as a theme in Arab films and television programming. The Lebanese Rahbani brothers produced the war film Safar Barlik in the 1960s. The Syrian drama series Ikhwat al-Turab (Brothers in Soil), directed by Najdat Anzour in the 1990s, shows soldiers being separated from their families and loved ones because of the Seferberlik.

Notes

References

Additional sources
 Al-Qattan, N. (n.d.). Remembering the Great War in Syrian and Lebanon, everything including the plague.
 Al-Qattan, N. (2004). Safarbarlik: Ottoman Syria and the Great War. In T. Philipp & C. Schumann (Eds.), in From the Syrian Land to the States of Syria and Lebanon, (pp. 163–173). Beirut: Beirut: Argon Verlag Wurzburg.
 Al-Taweel, K. (2010a). الوطن أون لاين ::: خبير بالعثمانية القديمة: ترجمات خاطئة تناولت تاريخ المدينة> ), Expert in Ottoman Turkish: Wrong Translations in writing the history of Madina. Al-Watan online. Retrieved March 21, 2014, from http://www.alwatan.com.sa/Culture/News_Detail.aspx?ArticleID=4992&CategoryID=7
 Al-Taweel, K. (2010b). الوطن أون لاين ::: مرشد: "سفربرلي" تعني التهجير الجماعي وليس ما ذهب إليه الكنيسي< Murshid: Safarberlik means collective deportation and not what Al-Kenisi said it means. Al-Watan online. Retrieved March 21, 2014, from http://www.alwatan.com.sa/Culture/News_Detail.aspx?ArticleID=5271&CategoryID=7
 Mina, H. (1975). Fragments of Memory: A Story of a Syrian Family (Interlink World Fiction): Hanna Mina, Olive Kenny, Lorne Kenny: 9781566565479: Amazon.com: Books. Damascus. Retrieved from https://www.amazon.com/Fragments-Memory-Syrian-Interlink-Fiction/dp/1566565472
 Phillipp, T., & Schaebler, B. (1998). The Syrian Land: Processes of Integration and Fragmentation. Bilad al-Sham from the 18th to the 20th Century (p. 405). Franz Steiner Verlag. Retrieved from https://www.amazon.com/The-Syrian-Land-Fragmentation-Islamstudien/dp/3515073094
 Schilcher, L. S. (1992). The Famine of 1915-1918 in Greater Syria. In hn P. Spagnolo (Ed.), Problems of the Modern Middle East in Historical Perspective (pp. 229–258). Oxford: Oxford University Press.
 Tamari, S., & Turjman, I. S. (2011). Year of the Locust: A Soldier's Diary and the Erasure of Palestine's Ottoman Past (p. 214). University of California Press. Retrieved from https://books.google.com/books?id=nvVs1EdJBRIC&pgis=1
مرشد, ا. أ. أ., & الطويل, ا. ا. خ. (2007). القصة الكاملة لكارثة التهجير العثمانية "سفر برلك" قبل 93 عام, The complete story of the catastrophy of Ottoman deportation Safarberlik. منتدى القصة العربية. Retrieved March 21, 2014, from http://www.arabicstory.net/forum/index.php?showtopic=6474
 Lubnān fī al-ḥarb, aw, Dhikrá al-ḥawādith wa-al-maẓālim fī Lubnān fī al-Ḥarb al-ʻUmūmīyah : 1914-1919, لبنان في الحرب : أو ذكرى الحوادث والمظالم في لبنان في الحرب العمومية، ١٩١٤

External links 
 https://twitter.com/Eqwaszx/status/227037168965672960 Twitter account
 http://www.thawraonline.sy/index.php/syrian-flags-list/21700-2013-07-08-09-15-13

Ottoman Empire in World War I
Second Balkan War